The 2019 Dutch Open, also known by its sponsored name Van Mossel Kia Dutch Open, was a professional tennis tournament played on clay courts. It was the first edition of the Challenger tournament which was part of the 2019 ATP Challenger Tour. It took place in Amersfoort, Netherlands between 15 and 21 July 2019.

Singles main draw entrants

Seeds

 1 Rankings are as of 1 July 2019.

Other entrants
The following players received wildcards into the singles main draw:
  Jesper de Jong
  Alec Deckers
  Niels Lootsma
  Ryan Nijboer
  Holger Vitus Nødskov Rune

The following player received entry into the singles main draw using a protected ranking:
  Aleksandre Metreveli

The following players received entry into the singles main draw using their ITF World Tennis Ranking:
  Corentin Denolly
  Christopher Heyman
  Karim-Mohamed Maamoun
  Botic van de Zandschulp
  Tim van Rijthoven

The following players received entry from the qualifying draw:
  Igor Sijsling
  Sem Verbeek

Champions

Singles

 Mats Moraing def.  Kimmer Coppejans 6–2, 3–6, 6–3.

Doubles

 Harri Heliövaara /  Emil Ruusuvuori def.  Jesper de Jong /  Ryan Nijboer 6–3, 6–4.

References

Dutch Open
2019 in Dutch tennis
July 2019 sports events in the Netherlands
2019 Dutch Open (tennis)
Dutch Open (tennis)